The Women's javelin throw event at the 1998 European Championships was held on Wednesday August 19, 1998, in Budapest, Hungary. There were a total number of 20 participating athletes. The qualification round was staged on Tuesday August 18, with the mark set at 61.00 metres. All results were made with a rough surfaced javelin (old design).

Medalists

Schedule
All times are Central European Time (UTC+1)

Abbreviations
All results shown are in metres

Records

Qualification

Group A

Group B

Final

See also
 1996 Women's Olympic Javelin Throw (Atlanta)
 1997 Women's World Championships Javelin Throw (Athens)
 1999 Women's World Championships Javelin Throw (Seville)
 2000 Women's Olympic Javelin Throw (Sydney)

References
 Results
 todor66
 koti.welho

Javelin throw
Javelin throw at the European Athletics Championships
1998 in women's athletics